The Sound of Sunbathing is the debut album from The Sinceros, a new wave and power pop band from England. The album, with initial copies pressed on orange vinyl, was released worldwide and achieved moderate commercial success. This is the only album so far released on CD (via Cherry Red Records), the follow-up being Pet Rock. The Sunbathing CD was released on 18 May 2009 with the catalogue number CDM RED 396. One track from this album, "Take Me to Your Leader", has appeared on the compilation albums New Wave Hits of the 70's & 80's and Big Hits, Skinny Ties: New Wave in the U.K.

Track listing (UK)
All tracks composed by Mark Kjeldsen; except where noted.
"I Still Miss You" 
"Quick Quick Slow"
"My Little Letter" 
"Hanging On Too Long" (Don Snow)
"Worlds Apart" 
"Take Me to Your Leader" 
"Little White Lie" 
"Break Her Heart" 
"So They Know" 
"Good Luck (To You)" (Ron François)

Track listing (USA)
All tracks composed by Mark Kjeldsen; except where noted.
"Take Me to Your Leader" 
"Worlds Apart" 
"Little White Lie" 
"So They Know" 
"Hanging On Too Long" (Don Snow)
"I Still Miss You" 
"Quick Quick Slow" 
"My Little Letter" 
"Break Her Heart" 
"Good Luck (To You)" (Ron François)

Personnel
The Sinceros
Mark Kjeldsen - guitar, vocals
Ron François - bass guitar, vocals
Don Snow - keyboards, vocals
Bobby Irwin - drums

Production credits
Produced by Joe Wissert
Engineered by Bill Price
Recorded at Wessex Studios, London

Critical reception 
Trouser Press praised the Sinceros for creating "two great tracks — a quirky bit of silliness called 'Take Me to Your Leader' and a Joe Jackson soundalike, 'Little White Lie'..." but expressed little enthusiasm for the album as a whole, saying that other than those two songs, "it's an amiable pop record with little character".

References

1979 debut albums
The Sinceros albums
Epic Records albums
Albums produced by Joe Wissert